Lee Bing (-2012) was a Hong Kong mezzo-soprano. She is best known internationally for an LP Lee Bing sings ancient and modern Chinese poems (1988). Tokwawan, Kowloon, Hong Kong: HK.

References

2012 deaths
Hong Kong mezzo-sopranos
Year of birth missing
20th-century Hong Kong women singers